Hyaluronidase PH-20 is an enzyme that in humans is encoded by the SPAM1 gene.

Hyaluronidase degrades hyaluronic acid, a major structural proteoglycan found in extracellular matrices and basement membranes. Six members of the hyaluronidase family are clustered into two tightly linked groups on chromosome 3p21.3 and 7q31.3. This gene was previously referred to as HYAL1 and HYA1 and has since been assigned the official symbol SPAM1; another family member on chromosome 3p21.3 has been assigned HYAL1. This gene encodes a GPI-anchored enzyme located on the human sperm surface and inner acrosomal membrane. This multifunctional protein is a hyaluronidase that enables sperm to penetrate through the hyaluronic acid-rich cumulus cell layer surrounding the oocyte, a receptor that plays a role in hyaluronic acid induced cell signaling, and a receptor that is involved in sperm-zona pellucida adhesion. Abnormal expression of this gene in tumors has implicated this protein in degradation of basement membranes leading to tumor invasion and metastasis. Multiple protein isoforms are encoded by transcript variants of this gene.

References

Further reading